Gurlan District (Гурлан тумани, گۇرلەن تۇمەنى) is a district of Xorazm Region in Uzbekistan. The capital lies at the town Gurlan. The district consists of 9 urban-type settlements (Gurlan, Chakkalar, Bozkala, Nurzamin, Nukus yop, Markaziy Guliston, Doʻsimbiy, Taxtakoʻpir, Yormish) and 9 rural communities.

References

Xorazm Region
Districts of Uzbekistan